YBNL (an abbreviation for Yahoo Boy No Laptop) is the second studio album by Nigerian rapper Olamide. It was released on November 12, 2012, as the follow-up to his debut studio album Rapsodi (2011). The album features guest appearances from Kayswitch, Tiwa Savage, Dammy Krane, Davido, Kida Kudz, Reminisce, Base 1, Buckwyla, and Minus 2. Its production was handled by Pheelz, Samklef, I.D Cabasa, 2Kriss and Tyrone. YBNL was supported by the singles "Ilefo Illuminati", "First of All", "Stupid Love" and "Voice of the Street".

Background
Olamide promoted the album by holding a launch party at Octopus Club in Yaba, Lagos; the party featured additional performances from Dammy Krane, Morell, Djzeez, Phyno, Phenom, Samklef, Skales and Lace. Prior to holding the album's launch party in Yaba, Olamide held a concert at Mazabs Event Centre in Ilorin on March 21, 2013.

Composition
The YBNL phrase is, in itself, a paradox. In layman's terms, Olamide wants to be fly like a "Yahoo Boy" but doesn't want to be associated with sending scam emails. The album's lyrics focus primarily on his love for God and the streets that raised him. In "Jesu O’ Kola", he looks to God for support because he believes the music industry castigated him. In the Church-inspired track "Jale", Olamide thanked God for preventing him from stealing. In "Voice of the Streets", he raps about his ambition to blow and about the passion and energy that young hustlers like himself possess. In "Street Love", he is reminiscent of his humble upbringing in Bariga. In "Money", Olamide talks about his constant quest for paper chasing. In "Fucking with the Devil", he said he's not "born again" but can hear angels calling.

Singles
The 2Kriss-produced track "Ilefo Illuminati" was released on November 20, 2011, as the album's lead single. The music video for the song was released on June 23, 2012; it was shot and directed in South Africa by Godfather Productions. The Pheelz-produced track "First of All" was released on June 21, 2012, as the album's second single. The music video for "First of All" was shot and directed in Nigeria by Patrick Ellis. The song's remix features vocals by D'banj and appeared on the 2013 compilation album, D'Kings Men. The Samklef-produced track "Stupid Love" was released on July 27, 2012, as the album's third single. The music video for the song was directed by Matt Max. The album's fourth single "Voice of the Street" was released on November 1, 2012. Its accompanying music video was also directed by Matt Max.

Critical reception

YBNL received generally positive reviews from music critics. Tayo Ayomide of Nigerian Entertainment Today awarded the album 3.5 stars out of 5, applauding Olamide for "emerging from the shadows of a hit making producer and a late Nigerian rap legend to stand in the spotlight and boldly show us what Nigerian rap has been missing for a while–the heartbeat of the streets." A writer for TayoTV awarded the album 8 stars out of 10, praising its rhymes and Olamide's delivery. A writer for Hi-Life Magazine assigned a rating of 7 stars out 10, commending the tracks "First of All" and "Stupid Love".

Accolades
YBNL won Best Rap Album and Album of the Year at The Headies 2013.

Track listing
From Jaguda.

Personnel

Olamide Adedeji – primary artist
Tiwatope Savage Balogun – featured artist
Dammy Krane – featured artist 
David Adeleke – featured artist 
Kidakudz – featured artist 
Reminisce – featured artist 
Base 1 – featured artist 
Fulado – featured artist 
Buckwyla – featured artist 
Starkash – featured artist 
Minus 2 – featured artist 
Pheelz – producer
Samklef – producer
I.D Cbasa – producer 
2Kriss – producer 
Tyrone – producer

Release history

References

2013 albums
Albums produced by Samklef
Olamide albums
Yoruba-language albums
Albums produced by Pheelz
Albums produced by I.D. Cabasa
YBNL Nation albums